is a Japanese cyclist. He competed in three events at the 1952 Summer Olympics.

References

1933 births
Living people
Japanese male cyclists
Olympic cyclists of Japan
Cyclists at the 1952 Summer Olympics